USS Wabash (ID-1824) was a German cargo ship, impounded in the neutral United States when World War I commenced. Once the United States entered the war, the ship was confiscated and turned over to the U.S. Navy for wartime use as USS Wabash.

Commercial career and internment 
SS Wartburg was a single-screw, steel-hulled freighter completed in 1900 at Newcastle upon Tyne, England, by Wigham Richardson and Co., Ltd., for service with the Deutsche Dampfschiffahrts-Gesellschaft "Hansa".

Prior to World War I she was operated commercially by the Norddeutscher Lloyd line under the German flag, with her name being changed to Tübingen in 1906-1907. In 1911, she collided with the minelayer . When the outbreak of World War I in August 1914 made the high seas unsafe for German shipping, she took refuge in an American port and was interned, as the United States at that time was still a neutral nation.

Seized in America 
When the United States was drawn into the war on the side opposed to Germany, America lost its neutrality and seized the Tübingen. In April 1917, the cargo ship was taken over by the United States Shipping Board (USSB). Renamed Seneca, she was part of the U.S. merchant marine until February 1918, when she was acquired by the Navy and placed in commission as USS Wabash (ID# 1824).

She was acquired by the U.S. Navy on 9 February 1918, at Hoboken, New Jersey, for use with the Naval Overseas Transportation Service. The cargo ship was renamed Wabash, designated Id. No. 1824, and commissioned on the same day.

World War I service  
Wabash departed New York City on 28 February, bound for France. After delivering her cargo of construction iron and ammunition at Pauillac, she returned to the United States on 22 April. She made four more voyages to St. Nazaire, France, and returned to New York City from her last run on 6 April 1919.

During her second such trip, while in convoy on the foggy night of 22 May 1918, Wabash collided with the U.S. Navy patrol vessel , sinking her. During the rest of the First World War, and in the months following the 11 November 1918 Armistice, she completed three more round-trip Atlantic Ocean crossings

Decommissioning 
Decommissioned on 21 April 1919, the freighter was returned to the U.S. Shipping Board. The ship subsequently home-ported at New York City and operated under the flag of the North Atlantic and Western Steamship Company, until some time in 1924 before being scrapped in Genoa, Italy on 22 July 1924.

References

External links 
 USS Wabash (ID # 1824) in 1918-1919

World War I cargo ships of the United States
Unclassified miscellaneous vessels of the United States Navy
Ships built on the River Tyne
1900 ships
Cargo ships of the United States Navy